Hi-5 is a boy band from Pretoria, South Africa singing mainly in Afrikaans language.

Formation
It was formed in 2003 and took part in the Crescendo annual music contest organized by ATKV (the Afrikaans Language and Culture Association, in Afrikaans, Afrikaanse Taal- en Kultuurvereniging), a major event for Afrikaans music, winning the title for that year. Niel Schoombee was the founding member of this popular boy band.

Career
Hi-5 released a 5-track EP Soebat in 2003 followed by a self-titled album Hi-5 (2004) with their second studio album being Versoeking released in 2006. The first single from the album, the title track "Versoeking", was an Afrikaans language cover of Arash's "Temptation". The popularity of their single and music video helped the band to further cement their success on the South African music charts. 
Hi-5 are also notable outside their home country South Africa for recording Afrikaans covers of Eurovision Song Contest entries.

In April 2007, Hi-5 had some limited success in Europe on an international contract with the resort, Sonamor in Majorca, Spain, in addition to showcasing Afrikaans music in other parts of Europe.

Members
The original members comprised:
Niel Schoombee
Nicolaas Swart
Shaun van Staden
Dihan Slabbert
JP Moggee

Later line-up comprised:
Niel Schoombee
Nicolaas Swart
Wynand Buitendag
Lee Scott
Renee Kruger

Discography

Albums and EPs

Singles
2003: "Een Hart Een Droom"
2003: "Soebat"
2004: "Kinders van die Wind"
2004: "Time After Time"
2005: "Shnappi"
2006: "Versoeking"

References

Culture of the City of Tshwane
Pretoria
South African pop music groups
South African boy bands